Muji or Muzi is a Loloish language cluster spoken by the Phula people of China. It is one of several such languages to go by the name Muji. Muji varieties are Northern Muji, Qila Muji, Southern Muji, and Bokha–Phuma.

The representative Southern Muji dialect studied in Pelkey (2011) is that of Pujiazhai (普家寨), Adebo Township (阿德博乡), Jinping County.

Qila Muji is spoken in the following three villages:
Qila (期腊) Laojizhai Township (老集寨乡), southern Jinping County, China
Wantan, Jinshuihe Township 金水河镇, southern Jinping County, China
Muong Gong, northwestern Lai Châu Province, Vietnam

Phonology

References

Further reading

 

Loloish languages
Languages of China